Aegis Global Academy provides an MBA equivalent management education, catering exclusively to the services industry. They partner with experts in the field of education and experience management and have crafted a program that immerses its students into experiential learning through live management of customer contact channels and internships for 65 percent of their course requirement.

About ICEM

The Institute of Customer Experience Management. (ICEM), the flagship institute of Aegis Global Academy, is the first-of-its-kind to offer an MBA equivalent program focused solely on customer experience management. It aims at creating professionals for the Service Sector. ICEM offers a variety of specializations according to service industry verticals. The curriculum of ICEM is heavily oriented towards practical experience through live customer contact management and internships.

Post Graduation Program in Business Management

The Institute of Customer Experience Management's Post Graduate Program in Business Management is a 15-month program with 65% Practical and 35% Theory. The 65% Practical module consists of field visits, case studies, role plays, managing live customer contact channels and internships for up to 16 weeks.

35% Theory consists of
 Principles of general management with customization for CLTV (Customer lifetime value) is taught by IIM Indore with a combination of classes at IIM Indore campus, IIM faculty visiting ICEM campus and synchronous learning methodology.
 Customer Experience Management by world-renowned SQC, Singapore, consisting of videos, classroom lectures and role plays.
 Industry vertical specific knowledge and related modules (Telecom, Retail, ITES, Banking and Insurance) is taught by core faculty and senior visiting faculty from the industry.
 Evaluation is basis progressive module.
 Participants also have an option to study an advanced course module of SQC in Singapore as part of an international exposure initiative for a nominal additional fee of INR 50,000, plus taxes and visa charges.

Management Internship

The opportunity for a 16-week internship is guaranteed in the related industry of specialization in leading corporate houses and this offers the students exposure to the real corporate environment.

Post Graduate Management Admission Procedure & Eligibility Criteria

Admissions are based on the over-all score obtained on entrance tests (CAT, XAT, MAT), followed by the Star Profiling Test and Personal Interviews.

Notes and references

External links
 
 Pagalguy.com - Aegis Global Academy
 Discussions on Aegis - ICEM

Business schools in Tamil Nadu